Blind football at the 2024 Summer Paralympics will be held at the Eiffel Tower Stadium in Paris, France.

Qualifying
There are eight men's teams who compete in the competition, each team must have a maximum of eight outfield players and two goalkeepers.

Medalists

See also
Football at the 2024 Summer Olympics

References

2024
International association football competitions hosted by France
Football
2024 in French sport